Graham Cairns (born 1971, UK) is an author and academic. He is the founder and director of the research organisation AMPS  Architecture Media Politics Society. He is Executive Editor of its associated peer-reviewed scholarly journal Architecture_MPS, ISSN 2050-9006, published by UCL Press. He researches and publishes on architecture and its relationship with visual culture and socio-politics. He has delivered talks, taught, ran workshops and held various positions at universities internationally.

Biography
Cairns studied architecture at Liverpool John Moores University and the University of Lincoln. His doctorate examined the relationship between advertising and commercial architecture and was awarded by the Superior Technical School of Architecture of Madrid. It was later developed into a book, Deciphering Art, Architecture and Advertising: Selling to the Sophisticated Consumer. In 1995 he founded and ran the UK based performance arts company Hybrid Artworks specializing in spatial installation and multi media performance. He lived in Spain between 2000-2005 and published his first book in Spanish: El Arquitecto Detrás de la Cámara: Una Visión Espacial del Cine.
In 2011 he founded the research organisation Architecture Media Politics Society and its associated journal. In this role he has organised academic conferences internationally with events in the UK, the US, Spain, Cyprus and Australia. Examples include 2014 events in both London and Los Angeles. He has also developed the 'interview article' as a form of academic publication Interview-articles have been published by authors such as Noam Chomsky, Kenneth Frampton, Daniel Libeskind and Michael Sorkin He has also established a resource repository as part of a collaboration between librarians and academics.
He is the author and editor seven published books on architecture, design, film and advertising. He has published in English and Spanish and his work has also been translated to French.

Research
Cairns has two areas of research: i) Architecture in its socio-cultural context; ii) Architecture and Visual Culture. Through AMPS he runs two research and publication programs that align with these areas of expertise.  Housing – Critical Futures  is a three year long programme of conferences, publications and workshops operating over ten countries.  It was launched in 2015. The Mediated City is a programme launched in 2014 that examines the role of technologies and medias on urban design, experience and living. As part of these research programmes he has initiated book series with Intellect Book, Bristol; Libri Publishing, Oxfordshire; and UCL Press, London.

Publications
Reification and Representation - Architecture in the Politico-Media-Complex. 2019. Routledge / Taylor&Francis: London..
Visioning Technologies – the architectures of sight. 2016. Routledge / Taylor&Francis: London. .
Reflections on Architecture, Society and Politics– Socio Cultural Tectonics in the 21st Century. 2016. Routledge / Taylor&Francis: London. .
Design for a Complex World – challenges in practice and education. 2014. Libri Publishing: London.   .
The Architecture of the Screen: Essays in Cinematographic Space. 2013. Intellect Books: Bristol. .
Reinventing Architecture and Interiors - A Socio-Political View on Building Adaptation. 2013. Libri Publishing: London.  .
Deciphering Art, Architecture and Advertising: Selling to the Sophisticated Consumer. 2010. Libri Publishing: London.  .
El Arquitecto Detrás de la Cámara: Una Visión Espacial del Cine. 2007. Abada Editores: Madrid. .

References

External links

Living people
1971 births